Aain Bahadur Shahi Thakuri is a Nepalese politician, belonging to the Nepali Congress currently serving as the member of the 2nd Federal Parliament of Nepal. In the 2022 Nepalese general election, he won the election from Mugu 1 (constituency).

References

Living people
Nepal MPs 2022–present
Nepali Congress politicians from Karnali Province
1970 births